Fatin are two Arabic unisex given names,  and . It is also used as a feminine given name and a surname. People with the name include:

Given name

First name

Male
 Fatin Youssef Bundagji (born 1958), Saudi Arabian businessperson
 Fatin Gökmen (1877–1955), Turkish astronomer and politician
 Fatin Abdel Wahab (1913–1972), Egyptian film director
 Fatin Rüştü Zorlu (1910–1961), Turkish diplomat and politician

Female
 Fatin Zakirah Zain Jalany (born 1997), Malaysian rhythmic gymnast
 Fatin al-Murr (born 1969), Lebanese academic and writer
 Fatin Shidqia (born 1996), Indonesian singer

Middle name
 Zaki Fatin Abdel Wahab (1961–2022), Egyptian actor and film director

Surname
 Igor Fatin (born 1962), Russian footballer
 Wendy Fatin (born 1941), Australian politician

Arabic masculine given names
Turkish masculine given names
Unisex given names